Isoetes echinospora, also known as spiny quillwort, spiny-spored quillwort or spring quillwort is a species of quillwort in the Isoetaceae family, and is the most abundant species in Canada. It can be found in shallow aquatic environments from Labrador and Newfoundland to Alaska, and south to Pennsylvania, Wisconsin, Colorado, and California. In Germany it is found in only two locations: the Feldsee and Lake Titisee, both in the High Black Forest.

It bears 10–30 green to yellow leaves and a two-lobed corm. European populations of the plant lack the stomata present in North American populations.

Isoetes muricata and Isoetes echinospora var. braunii refer to the North American plants, but are often considered synonyms of Europe's I. exhinospora.

References

echinospora
Flora of North America
Flora of Germany